Guru Nanak High School in Mahim, Mumbai is a semi-English medium school, run by Guru Nanak Vidyak Society, affiliated to Maharashtra State Board of Secondary and Higher Secondary Education. It is private aided school with Co-educational status. It is ranked Tier-‘C’ by EduRaft.Com.  Not to be confused with the Guru Nanak Mission High School on Mahakali Caves Road in Chakala, Mumbai, which is managed by the charity Guru Nanak Punjabi Sabha, established by Dr Shamsher Singh Jolly along with Gurdwara Guru Nanak Punjabi Sabha Chakala.

History 
Guru Nanak High School was established in 1952 by Guru Nanak Vidyak Society in Mahim, Mumbai. It adjoins to Gurudwara Khalsa Sabha, Matunga.

Location 

The school is located in Mahim, behind the City Light Cinema, Guru Nanak Marg, and adjacent Gurudwara Khalsa Sabha sharing a common compound. It is near by Matunga Road railway station and close to historical Shivaji Park, Dadar.

Facilities 
The Scout and Guide are available to student of VIII to X. In computer lab, there have two teachers conducting computer classes from standard 3rd to 10th, as per the syllabus. There are altogether eight computers in the lab. The school has a separate library with 1625 books.

References

External links

Official website

High schools and secondary schools in Mumbai
Educational institutions established in 1952
1952 establishments in Bombay State